Larry Wilcox Stadium is a sport stadium in Atchison, Kansas, United States.  The facility is primarily used by Benedictine College for college football, track and field.  It is also host to other university and city athletic and non-athletic events including local high school football games.

The stadium was named for current Benedictine football coach and athletic director Larry Wilcox.  The facility has hosted multiple National Association of Intercollegiate Athletics football playoff games during its use.

References

External links
 

College football venues
Benedictine Ravens football
American football venues in Kansas
Buildings and structures in Atchison County, Kansas